Tom Guise (1857–1930) was an American actor on stage and screen. He appeared in numerous films in the decade spanning 1917 to 1927.

He was one of the popular stars in the film adaptation of the controversial book Black Oxen. His performance in 23 1/2 Hours' Leave was described as clever.

Partial filmography

 Sweetheart of the Doomed (1917) as General Gabriel Durand
 Time Locks and Diamonds (1917) as Howe Seymour
 Fighting Back (1917) as Colonel Hampton
 The Snarl (1917) as Opera Manager
 The Stainless Barrier (1917) as Thomas Crosby
 The Tar Heel Warrior (1917) as Major Amos
 The Fuel of Life (1917) as Goldman
 Indiscreet Corinne (1917) as Mr. Chilvers
 Idolators (1917) as Burr Britton
The Clodhopper (1917) as Karl Seligman 
The Crab (1917) as 'Doc' Wingate (*as Thomas Guise)
Chicken Casey (1917) as Israel Harris Connelly 
Wooden Shoes (1917) as Rufus Smith
Vive la France! (1918) as Colonel Bouchier
The Man from Funeral Range (1918) as Colonel Leighton
23 1/2 Hours' Leave (1919) as General Dodge
The Love That Dares (1919) as Rutherford
The Midnight Stage (1919) as Elias Lynch (*Thomas Guise) 
The Woman Michael Married (1919) as Ordsway, Sr. 
Josselyn's Wife (1919) as Thomas Josselyn 
 When a Man Loves (1919) as Lord Bannister
Hearts Asleep (1919) as Andrew Calvert
One Hour Before Dawn (1920) as Judge Copeland
 Number 99 (1920) as James Valentine
 The Dream Cheater (1920) as Patrick FitzGeorge 
 $30,000 (1920) as Mat Lloyd
 Smoldering Embers (1920) as Congressman Wyatt
Alarm Clock Andy (1920) as Mr. Wells
The Passionate Pilgrim (1921) as Senator Watt
Love Is an Awful Thing (1922) as Judge Griggs 
 Wolf Law (1922) as  Etienne De Croteau
 Sisters (1922) as Doctor Strickland
 The Strangers' Banquet (1922) as Bride's father
The Trouper (1922) as Warren Selden (credited as Tom S. Guise)
Crossed Wires (1923) as Bellamy Benson 
Jazzmania (1923) as General Muroff 
Black Oxen (1923) as Judge Gavin Trent, extant 
Around the World in 18 Days (1923) as Davis
Crooked Alley (1923) as Judge Milnar
Held to Answer (1923) as The Judge (as Thomas Guise) 
Stepping Fast (1923) as Quentin Durant
 Garrison's Finish (1923) as Major Desha
 His Forgotten Wife (1924) as Judge Henry
After the Ball as Mark Trevelyan
Secrets of the Night (1924) as Colonel James Constance
The Beautiful Cheat (1926) as Leland Bruckman 
Wedding Bills (1927) as Mr. Markham 
The Claw (1927) as Marquis de Stair

References

External links

1857 births
1930 deaths
American male stage actors
American male film actors
American male silent film actors
19th-century American male actors
20th-century American male actors
Male actors from Detroit